James Suddick (1 February 1878 – 1967) was an English footballer who played in the Football League for Aston Villa, Middlesbrough  and Nottingham Forest.

References

1878 births
1967 deaths
English footballers
Association football forwards
English Football League players
South Bank F.C. players
Middlesbrough F.C. players
Aston Villa F.C. players
Nottingham Forest F.C. players
Thornaby F.C. players